Tricky Dicks is a 1953 short subject directed by Jules White starring American slapstick comedy team The Three Stooges (Moe Howard, Larry Fine and Shemp Howard). It is the 147th entry in the series released by Columbia Pictures starring the comedians, who released 190 shorts for the studio between 1934 and 1959.

Plot
The Stooges are detectives who have nearly mastered the game of gin rummy. They are frequently interrupted by a very loudly ringing telephone. Shemp brings in the pickpocket Slick Chick (Connie Cezan) who manages to talk her way out of the station. Shemp joins the Gin Rummy game before the three of them tangle with a very stubborn filing cabinet.

After nearly finishing the game, the Stooges police chief B. A. Copper (Ferris Taylor) has just about had it with their goofing off, and demands that they find the murderer of Slug McGurk within 24 hours. Right from the start, the trio have Chopper (Phil Arnold), a prisoner who attempts to confess to the crime. Unfortunately, his sesquipedalian confession ("I am the culprit who perpetrated this heinous incident!") confuses the simple-minded Stooges, who insist he is avoiding the question. Frustrated, the Stooges throw Chopper back in a jail cell. Larry kisses a female officer who promptly slaps him.

A pedestrian, (Murray Alper), shows up wanting to talk to them, but is thrown out by an angry Moe, (who has apparently warned him several times before that they were too busy to listen) and warned to get out and stay out.

The next man they bring up is a witness, an organ grinder with a monkey named Antonio Zucchini Salami Gorgonzola dePizza (Benny Rubin). The witness begins to download his information to the Stooges, but his Italian looks do not match the English cockney accent that comes out of his mouth. When Moe asks him what he was doing at the time of the murder, dePizza flees in terror at the thought of blood.

Next, Shemp takes a call regarding a dismissed bootlegging charge, stating "The D.A. says we can't make a case out of 11 bottles" (!). Just when all seems lost Larry returns with Chopper who says he wants to confess to the murder. However, while taking down his confession, the pedestrian shows up again and in fury that Chopper is going to take the credit of the murder, he confess outright that he's the actual killer and pulls out a gun and starts shooting everything in site. The Stooges take cover in their office, as the killer shoots over 60 times without reloading. Everyone is trapped until dePizza's monkey drops several bowling balls on the killer's head, knocking him cold. Shemp who got shot close-up look to be unharmed, only for the bottle of "Old Panther" alcohol he starts drinking to pour out of the holes in his stomach and Moe and Larry decide to take a shower.

Cast
 Moe Howard as Moe
 Larry Fine as Larry
 Shemp Howard as Shemp
 Ferris Taylor as B. A. Copper
 Benny Rubin as Antonio Zuchini Salami Gorgonzola de Pizza
 Connie Cezan as Slick Chick
 Phil Arnold as Chopper
 Murray Alper as Mr. Pardon
 Suzanne Ridgeway as Policewoman (uncredited)

Production notes
Tricky Dicks was filmed in July 1952 and is a spoof of the 1951 film Detective Story.

The filing cabinet footage is recycled from Hold That Lion!

References

External links 
 
 
Tricky Dicks at threestooges.net

1953 films
1953 comedy films
The Three Stooges films
American black-and-white films
Films directed by Jules White
Columbia Pictures short films
American slapstick comedy films
1950s English-language films
1950s American films